The Young Alternative for Germany ( or JA) is a political youth organisation in Germany. Founded on 15 June 2013 in Darmstadt, and open to people aged 14 to 35 years, it presents itself as the youth wing of the Alternative for Germany (AfD) party, but remains legally independent. Chairman is Hannes Gnauck, vice-chairpersons are Sven Kachelmann, Tomasz Froelich and Nils Hartwig.

Since 2019 the German national intelligence service Federal Office for the Protection of the Constitution (BfV) classified JA as “Prüffall“, meaning the agency is monitoring the public activities of JA.

History
In view of the JA's independence it has been regarded by the AfD hierarchy as being somewhat wayward, with the JA repeatedly accused of being "too far right," politically regressive and anti-feminist among the German media.'In March 2014, The Junge Alternative hosted Nigel Farage who had been invited to address the party's North Rhine-Westphalia organisation in Cologne. The invitation is alleged to have caused some trouble within the AfD itself over the youth wing’s unauthorised invitation of Farage, with the regional association and the youth wing wanting to stress their independence. The invitation was contrary to a decision of the AfD National Executive whose policy is that official contact with foreign parties is decided only by the federal executive. Nigel Farage's presence apparently led to a deterioration in relations with Bernd Lucke, the then-AfD leader, who called the move a "sign of poor political tact."

The JA launched an anti-feminist campaign entitled "Gleichberechtigung statt Gleichmacherei''" (variously translated as "equal rights, not levelling down" or "equality instead of uniformity") on Facebook in response to the Young Socialists in the SPD, which posted photos supportive of feminism to mark International Women's Day. The Facebook page of JA describes feminism as a "left-wing ideology", and asks people to post reasons to reject it. With the JA also citing opposition to gender quota proposals in Germany for women as a motivation. Sections of the German media also labelled election campaign material of the JA which showed attractive women in swimwear under the slogan "equality instead of uniformity" as in bad taste. The JA followed with a poster of four shirtless men under the slogan "end soft justice".

In May 2014 The JA is said to have further irritated AfD bosses with a statement they released on Facebook advocating vigilante action against crime.

References

External links
  

Alternative for Germany
Youth wings of political parties in Germany
Youth wings of conservative parties
Organizations established in 2013
2013 establishments in Germany
National conservatism
Right-wing populism in Germany
Anti-Islam sentiment in Germany